Ceratosolen is an Old World wasp genus in the family Agaonidae (fig wasps). They are pollinators of the monoecious fig subsections Sycomorus and Sycocarpus, and the section Neomorphe, all belonging to the subgenus Sycomorus. The genus is native to the Palearctic, Afrotropical, Indomalayan and Australasian realms.

Biology
Adults enter through the fig ostiole, a narrow, bract-lined passage, then pollinate and attempt to oviposit on the flowers. Flower ovules that receive an egg become galled and the larvae consume the gall tissue. Pollinated flowers missed by the wasps produce one seed each. The adult offspring emerge from the gall and mate in the fig, before the winged female wasps disperse, carrying the flower pollen with them.

Associations
Several non-pollinating wasp species of the Chalcidoidea exploit the mutualism. Sycophaga sycomori oviposits inside the short-style flowers, thereby stimulating the growth of endosperm tissue and the enlargement and ripening of the syconium which holds the wasp-bearing drupelets, without pollination taking place. The parasitic species Apocrypta guineensis and Sycoscapter niger use long ovipositors to pierce the fig wall to infect the larvae during their development inside the flower galls, and consequently reduce pollinator production.

Species
There are more than 60 described species, including:
 Ceratosolen abnormis Wiebes, 1963
 Ceratosolen acutatus Mayr, 1906
 Ceratosolen adenospermae Wiebes, 1965
 Ceratosolen albulus Wiebes, 1963
 Ceratosolen appendiculatus (Mayr, 1885)
 Ceratosolen arabicus Mayr, 1906
 Ceratosolen armipes Wiebes, 1963
 Ceratosolen bakeri Grandi, 1927
 Ceratosolen bianchii Wiebes, 1963
 Ceratosolen bimerus Wiebes, 1965

 Ceratosolen solmsi (Mayr, 1885)
 Ceratosolen solomensis Wiebes, 1994
 Ceratosolen sordidus Wiebes, 1963
 Ceratosolen stupefactus Wiebes, 1989
 Ceratosolen vechti Wiebes, 1963
 Ceratosolen vetustus Wiebes, 1994
 Ceratosolen vissali Wiebes, 1981
 Ceratosolen wui Chen & Chou, 1997

References

External links 

Agaonidae
Hymenoptera genera